Royal Institute International School is a private sector educational institute in Sri Lanka providing primary and secondary education.

In addition to the Royal Institute main school at Havelock Town, Colombo, it has branch schools in Nugegoda, Maharagama, Gampaha which provide mixed education while the branch school in Maya Avenue is exclusively for girls.

History of Royal Institute 
The roots of Royal Institute go back to 1971 when its founder and current Chairman, G. T. Bandara, commenced preparing students for local A levels examinations and undergraduate degrees (external) of the University of Peradeniya in Physical and Biological Sciences.

Royal Institute International School of Higher Education was established in 1982 as a private limited liability company to provide international education by introducing London O level and A level courses.

With a view to provide a continuity of education up to tertiary level, after negotiating with the University of London, the Institute commenced preparing students for the internationally reputed degrees of the University of London in 1991.

As a part of the general development plan to expand activities further, a branch school was established in Nugegoda in 1993 to provide primary education which has since been upgraded to a fully fledged International School. In the year 2005 another branch was established in Maharagama followed by starting an International girls school in Colombo 6 in 2008 in order to accommodate the aspirations of certain parents who wished to educate their daughters. In 2013 another branch was opened in Gampaha.

School motto 
The school motto is "Light of learning"

School flag 
The school flag, rectangular in shape has the Royal Institute logo at the centre in dark brown on a cream background and the words “Royal Institute” in dark brown at the bottom printed in Cooper Black font.

Notable alumni 
 Shanudrie Priyasad, actress
 Dananjaya Hettiarachchi, Orator

References 

International schools in Sri Lanka